The CS 36 Merlin is a Canadian sailboat, that was designed by Tony Castro and first built in 1986. The design is out of production.

Production
The boat was built by CS Yachts in Canada, who completed 100 examples between 1986 and 1990.

The CS 36 Merlin was produced for almost a year side-by-side with the CS 36, which then became known as the CS 36 Traditional. After the production overlap the Merlin replaced the CS 36 in company's line.

About 20 of the 100 Merlins built were supplied to charter operators for their fleets.

Design

The CS 36 Merlin is a small recreational keelboat, built predominantly of vacuum bag moulded fibreglass or Kevlar with a balsa wood core above the waterline. It has a masthead sloop rig, an internally-mounted spade-type rudder and a fixed fin keel. It displaces  and carries  of ballast.

As a result of the long options list, no two boats outside the charter fleets were built in the same configuration.

The boat has a PHRF racing average handicap of 141 with a high of 141 and low of 141.

See also
List of sailing boat types

References

External links

Keelboats
1980s sailboat type designs
Sailing yachts
Sailboat type designs by Tony Castro
Sailboat types built by CS Yachts